Sarah Allan (born 19 November 1997) is an Australian rules footballer playing for the Adelaide Football Club in the AFL Women's competition.

Early life and career
Allan's father was Keith Allan, who played in the South Australian National Football League for Central District Football Club. She grew up in the south east of South Australia on the Limestone Coast, originally from Beachport but later moving to Millicent.

As a junior player, Allan was twice named in the Youth Girls All-Australian team. In 2016, when playing in the South Australian Women's Football League for Salisbury, she chose to wear the same number as her father, the number 39.

AFLW career (2017–present)
Allan was drafted by Adelaide with their sixteenth selection and 122nd overall in the 2016 AFL Women's draft, and she kept her playing number 39 upon joining the club. She made her debut in the thirty-six point win against  at Thebarton Oval in the opening round of the 2017 season. She was a part of Adelaide's premiership side after the club defeated  by six points at Metricon Stadium in the AFL Women's Grand Final. She missed two matches for the season to finish with six matches in her debut season.

Adelaide signed Allan for the 2018 season during the trade period in May 2017. During the 2017 draft, Allan's younger sister Jessica Allan joined the team, and the Allans became the second pair of sisters in the AFLW (after Sarah and Jess Hosking from ).

After floating around the ground in 2017, Allan began to settle in her position as a key defender in 2018, regularly tagging opposition teams' best tall forward in matches, and she received a nomination for the 2018 AFL Women's Rising Star award after recording eleven disposals and four rebound 50s in Adelaide's round 6 win against . Playing all seven matches for the season she was also nominated for the All-Australian team, as well as being second in the Crows' club champion award (one of only four players in the team to receive maximum votes in a single game) and being named the team's best defensive player.

The 2020 AFL Women's season saw Allan obtain her first AFL Women's All-Australian team selection, named in the full back position. In the 2021 AFL Women's season, Allan was awarded with her second All-Australian blazer, again named on the full back position.

Player profile
Allan is a versatile key-position player capable of playing in the forward line, in defence or in the ruck.

Statistics
Statistics are correct to the end of the 2021 season.

|- style="background:#EAEAEA"
| scope=row bgcolor=F0E68C | 2017# 
| 
| 39 || 6 || 0 || 1 || 19 || 20 || 39 || 9 || 9 || 0.0 || 0.1 || 3.2 || 3.3 || 6.5 || 1.5 || 1.5 || 0
|-
| scope="row" text-align:center | 2018
| 
| 39 || 7 || 0 || 0 || 51 || 12 || 63 || 8 || 14 || 0.0 || 0.0 || 7.3 || 1.7 || 9.0 || 1.1 || 2.0 || 0
|- style="background:#EAEAEA"
| scope=row bgcolor=F0E68C | 2019# 
| 
| 39 || 9 || 0 || 0 || 54 || 29 || 83 || 20 || 13 || 0.0 || 0.0 || 6.0 || 3.2 || 9.2 || 2.2 || 1.4 || 1
|- 
| scope=row | 2020 ||  || 39
| 6 || 0 || 0 || 51 || 24 || 75 || 21 || 11 || 0.0 || 0.0 || 8.5 || 4.0 || 12.5 || 3.5 || 1.8 || 0
|- style=background:#EAEAEA
| scope=row text-align:center | 2021 ||  || 39
| 11 || 0 || 0 || 85 || 53 || 138 || 23 || 13 || 0.0 || 0.0 || 7.7 || 4.8 || 12.5 || 2.1 || 1.2 || 0
|- class="sortbottom"
! colspan=3 | Career
! 39
! 0
! 1
! 260
! 138
! 398
! 81
! 60
! 0.0
! 0.1
! 6.7
! 3.5
! 10.2
! 2.1
! 1.5
! 1
|}

References

External links 

1997 births
Living people
Adelaide Football Club (AFLW) players
Australian rules footballers from South Australia